The Golden Butterfly  is a 1926 Austrian-German silent drama film directed by Michael Curtiz and starring Hermann Leffler, Lili Damita and Nils Asther. It was based on the 1915 short story "The Making of Mac's" by British author P. G. Wodehouse. The film was released in the United Kingdom as The Golden Butterfly, in a form shortened to 5 reels, and had a limited release in the US under the title The Road to Happiness.

The film was shot at the Johannisthal Studios in Berlin and on location in London and Cambridge. The film's sets were designed by the art director Paul Leni. It was made as a co-production between the Austrian Sascha Film and the German Phoebus Film. It was released in Britain by the Stoll Pictures company. It was the last film directed by the Hungarian Michael Curtiz in Germany before he immigrated to the United States.

Cast

References

Bibliography

External links

1926 films
Films based on works by P. G. Wodehouse
Films of the Weimar Republic
Films directed by Michael Curtiz
German silent feature films
Austrian silent feature films
Austrian black-and-white films
German black-and-white films
Films shot at Johannisthal Studios
German drama films
1926 drama films
Danish drama films
Austrian drama films
Phoebus Film films
Silent drama films
1920s German films